Slewton Combe, also known as the Slewton Valley is an outlying farmstead approximately one mile to the East of the East Devon village of Whimple. Although outside of the officially recognised AONB boundaries it is widely regarded as a particularly beautiful area in the locality. The name Slewton derives from the Old English word 'sloh' meaning slough or mirey place and 'Combe' or 'Coombe' is a place name deriving from the Old English 'cumb', particularly common in the West Country meaning a short or broad valley.

In recent years there has been confusion as to the location of "Slewton proper" due to the emergence of the newly built 'Slewton Crescent' within the village of Whimple upon the old Whiteways Cyder Factory site despite it being two miles away from Slewton Combe and postage discrepancies have become a regular occurrence.

East Devon District